Sosu Seowon is the oldest seowon, private Neo-Confucian academy in Korea which was established during the Joseon Dynasty period. It was found at the entrance of Suksusa Temple, in Sunheung-myeon, Yeongju City, Gyeongsangbuk-do South Korea. Sosu Seowon was founded by Ju Sebung (주세붕/ 1495–1554), who was serving as magistrate of Pungseong county.

Sosu Seowon was one of 47 seowons that survived from the Seowon Abolishment by Heungseon Daewongun Regent in 1871. It has been well preserved retaining most of its old structures and is designated as National Treasure of South Korea No.55

History
In 1542, during the 37th year of King Jungjong's reign (1506–44) of the Joseon Dynasty, the magistrate of Punggi County and Confucian scholar, Ju Se-bung, built Baekundong Seowon, renamed to Sosu Seowon in 1550, to honor the peaceful times of Goryeo. Also in 1550, during the reign of King Myeongjong of the Joseon Dynasty, Toegye Yi Hwang established Sosu Seowon as the first legislated private institute of Korea.

During the Joseon era (1392–1910), Korean Buddhism suffered heavy persecution.  Many temples were closed and the buildings repurposed. Sosu Seowon originally had been a Buddhist temple and then became a private academy.

Today
On the right of the Sosu Seowon entrance is the Okgyesu, a stream of the Nakdong River coming from Mt. Sobaek. Inside Sosu Seowon's auditorium is a 'Sosu Seowon' sign engraved by King Myeongjong. Behind the auditorium there are Jikbangjae, Ilshinjae, Hakgujae and Jirakjae. On the east side are the Seogo, the portrait of Anhyang (National Treasure No.111) painted at the end of Goryeo Dynasty, and the Munseong Tomb where the Daesungjisung King Munseon's Jeonjwado (National Treasure No.485) is enshrined.

External links
Sosu Confucian School in South Korea
Sosu Seowon Academy (built 1542 onward)
Yeongju, Where Confucian Values Reside

Seowon
National Treasures of South Korea
North Gyeongsang Province